Genesis is a 2013 Philippine television drama science fiction series broadcast by GMA Network. Directed by Joyce E. Bernal and Mark A. Reyes, it stars Dingdong Dantes. It premiered on October 14, 2013 on the network's Telebabad line up. The series concluded on December 27, 2013 with a total of 55 episodes. It was replaced by Carmela: Ang Pinakamagandang Babae sa Mundong Ibabaw in its timeslot.

Cast and characters

Lead cast
 Dingdong Dantes as Isaak Macalintal

Supporting cast
 Rhian Ramos as Racquel Hernandez-De Guzman
 Lorna Tolentino as Sandra Sebastian-Trinidad
 TJ Trinidad as Paolo De Guzman
 Lauren Young as Sheila Sebastian-Santillian
 Ronnie Henares as Emil Trinidad
 Jackie Lou Blanco as Ramona Escalabre
 Irma Adlawan as Fely Hernandez
 Betong Sumaya as Lito "Tolits" Dimagiba
 Luane Dy as Jill Galvez
 Carlo Gonzales as Waldo Calderon
 Sasha Baldoza as Osie Macalintal
 Marc Justine Alvarez as MJ Trinidad
 Annette Samin as Summer Trinidad

Guest cast
 Angel Aquino as Genesis' voice
 Isabelle Daza as Helen
 Snooky Serna as Elena Santillian
 Laurice Guillen as Rosario Macalintal
 Lito Legaspi as Leandro Macalintal
 Robert Arevalo as a former president
 Gardo Versoza as Ka Andoy
 Mark Anthony Fernandez as Joel
 Ervic Vijandre as Fredo
 Daria Ramirez as Linda
 Juan Rodrigo as Lazon 
 Derrick Monasterio as Randy
 Barbie Forteza as Faith
 Sharmaine Arnaiz as Donna Dimaano
 Rolly Innocencio as Jeffrey
 Mike Lloren as Alberto
 Art Acuña as a policeman
 Archie Adamos as a policeman
 Edwin Reyes as a policeman
 Pauleen Luna as young Sandra
 Timothy Chan as young Isaak
 Jillian Ward as young Racquel

Ratings
According to AGB Nielsen Philippines' Mega Manila household television ratings, the pilot episode of Genesis earned a 22.5% rating. While the final episode scored a 22.1% rating.

References

External links
 

2013 Philippine television series debuts
2013 Philippine television series endings
Filipino-language television shows
GMA Network drama series
Philippine science fiction television series
Television shows set in the Philippines